Janni Thomsen (born 16 February 2000) is a Danish football player who plays as a midfielder for Vålerenga in Norway top-division Toppserien and for the Danish national team.

She made international debut on the Danish national team on the 4 March 2020, against Norway at the 2020 Algarve Cup.

International goals

Honours 
Elitedivisionen
Bronze Medalist: 2019

References

External links
 Profile at the Danish Football Union
 

2000 births
Living people
Danish women's footballers
Women's association football midfielders
Denmark women's international footballers
Danish expatriate women's footballers
Danish expatriate sportspeople in Norway
Expatriate women's footballers in Norway
People from Kjellerup
Sportspeople from the Central Denmark Region
UEFA Women's Euro 2022 players